Yunan may refer to:

China 
 Either of two distinct counties-level divisions in Guangdong, China:
 Yunan County (郁南县)
 Yun'an District (云安区)
 Yu Nan (born 1978), Chinese actress

Other uses 
 King Yunan, a character in One Thousand and One Nights
 Yunan, oriental name for the Ionia
 General Yunan, a character in Amphibia

See also

 Yunnan, a province of China
 Nanyu (disambiguation)
 
 
 
 雲南 (disambiguation)
 Yun (disambiguation)
 Yu (disambiguation)
 Nan (disambiguation)
 An (disambiguation)